Abrothrix olivaceus markhami, also known as the Wellington Akodont or Markham's Grass Mouse, is a subspecies of the South American rodent Abrothrix olivaceus. It occurs on Wellington Island and the nearby Southern Patagonian Ice Field in southern Chile. It was previously recognized as a valid species, but is close to other recognized subspecies of A. olivaceus.

References

Literature cited
Musser, G.G. and Carleton, M.D. 2005. Superfamily Muroidea. Pp. 894–1531 in Wilson, D.E. and Reeder, D.M. (eds.). Mammal Species of the World: a taxonomic and geographic reference. 3rd ed. Baltimore: The Johns Hopkins University Press, 2 vols., 2142 pp. 
Patterson, B. and D'Elia, G. 2008. . In IUCN. IUCN Red List of Threatened Species. Version 2009.2. <www.iucnredlist.org>. Downloaded on January 12, 2010.
Rodríguez-Serrano, E., Hernández, C.E. and Palma, R.E. 2008. A new record and an evaluation of the phylogenetic relationships of Abrothrix olivaceus markhami (Rodentia: Sigmodontinae). Mammalian Biology 73(4):309–317.

Mammals of Chile
Abrothrix
Mammals described in 1973
Taxonomy articles created by Polbot